The Republican Attorneys General Association (RAGA) is a United States national political advocacy group that focuses on electing Republicans as state attorneys general. Its Democratic counterpart is the Democratic Attorneys General Association.

Operations 

RAGA operated as an arm of the Republican State Leadership Committee until 2014, when RAGA was split off.

The current chairman is Alan Wilson, Attorney General of South Carolina.

Controversy 

RAGA operates The Rule of Law Defense Fund, which became the center of controversy following revelations that it had sponsored mass robocalls urging recipients to support President Donald Trump's rally in front of the Capitol on January 6; the rally resulted in the 2021 United States Capitol attack. The robocall did not advocate for violence or storming the Capitol complex.

Following the January 6 attack, donations to RAGA dropped significantly. The executive director of RAGA, resigned less than a week after the robocall and attack. Chairman Christopher M. Carr, Georgia's Attorney General, resigned in April 2021 as a result of the split within the group over the January 6 attack.

External links 
 Official website

References 

Conservative political advocacy groups in the United States
527 organizations